Steve Schottel  (born 1948) is a former American football coach.  He was the head football coach at Baker University in Baldwin City, Kansas for the 1995 season.  His coaching record at Baker was 3–6.

Schottel resigned the post after less than a year.  Before taking the position at Baker, he was an assistant coach for the Benedictine Ravens, Missouri Tigers,  Louisville, Michigan State, Colorado, William Jewell, and Missouri Western as well as several stops in the high school ranks.

He is the son of former Detroit Lions football player Ivan Schottel.  His father was a head coach of Northwest Missouri State Bearcats football in Maryville, Missouri and Steve graduated Maryville High School in 1966 and was an assistant coach at the school in 1970.

Head coaching record

References

1948 births
Living people
American football quarterbacks
Baker Wildcats football coaches
Benedictine Ravens football coaches
Colorado Buffaloes football coaches
Louisville Cardinals football coaches
Michigan State Spartans football coaches
Missouri Tigers football coaches
Missouri Western Griffons football coaches
Northwest Missouri State Bearcats football players
Southeast Missouri State Redhawks football coaches
William Jewell Cardinals football coaches
High school football coaches in Missouri